Scriptoplusia nigriluna is a moth of the family Noctuidae first described by Francis Walker in 1858. It is found throughout the Oriental tropics of India, Sri Lanka, Bangladesh, Japan and the South East Asian region.

Two subspecies are known - Scriptoplusia nigriluna nigriluna and Scriptoplusia nigriluna noona. Larval host plants include Acalypha species.

References

External links
Taxonomic and zoogeographical studies on the subfamily Plusiinae (Lepidoptera, Noctuidae). The Palaeotropical, Oriental and Nearctic material of the Zoological Museum, Copenhagen

Moths of Asia
Moths described in 1857
Plusiinae